Mágica juventud (English title: Magic youth) is a Mexican telenovela produced by Emilio Larrosa for Televisa in 1992.

Kate del Castillo and Héctor Soberón starred as protagonists, while Sergio Sendel, Amairani and Marisol Santacruz starred as antagonists. Gabriela Platas starred as young antagonist. Raymundo Capetillo and Gilberto Román starred as adult antagonists. Carmen Montejo starred as stellar performance.

Plot 
Miguel is a young man working in a zoo. Hiding a dark secret: a few years ago was part of a criminal gang, which was captured. Miguel went to jail, but far from being restored when leaving becomes a young aggressive and resentful against society.

One day assists the restaurant called "La Hamburguesa Mágica" very popular among young people served by Pepita, friendly old woman who is a friend of all. There he meets Fernanda, a cute young cheerful and kind, and both fall in love.

Miguel feels he has finally found the love that lacked and has every intention to change its attitude, but Fernanda begins to investigate his past and this causes Miguel rears its old self again and Fernanda away. However, you will realize how much he loves her and that is the only woman who has really interested him, and look to get back with her, but will have to fight the intrigues of Leonardo Grimaldi, a young man without morals or scruples looking stay with Fernanda.

Cast 
 
Kate del Castillo as Fernanda Gutiérrez Mercedes
Héctor Soberón as Miguel Hernández Sarmiento
Marisol Santacruz as Patricia Grimaldi Retana
Carmen Montejo as Leonor Jiménez Vda. de Retana/Pepita
Sergio Sendel as Leonardo Grimaldi Retana
Amairani as Consuelo Gutiérrez
Gabriela Platas as Brenda del Conde Sierra
Raymundo Capetillo as Ernesto Grimaldi Ornelas
Gilberto Román as Gonzalo Zapata
Karen Sentíes as Laura Alonso Suárez
Carlos Cámara as Ezequiel Morales López
María Montejo as Carmen Mercedes de Gutiérrez
Roberto Sen as Eusebio Gutiérrez Maldonado
Manuel Saval as Javier Cuartas Toledo
Hilda Aguirre as Clara Aguirre Fernández
Tina Romero as Silvia Aguirre Fernández
Sussan Taunton as Claudia Roldán Martínez
Ramón Abascal as Gerardo Núñez García
Jorge Salinas as Héctor Rueda Montoya
Raúl Alberto as Alejandro Zapata Martín
Claudia Silva as Merlina Sán Miguel Sinisterra
Mauricio Islas as Alfredo Camacho Talavera
Vanessa Villela as Alicia Talamonti Cuadrado
Roberto Palazuelos as himself
Antonio Miguel as Don Cástulo
Raquel Morell as Eleonor Retana Jiménez
José Ángel García as Víctor
Radamés de Jesús as Carlos
Alejandra Morales as Yolanda
Óscar Vallejo as Chucho
Magaly as Odette
Raúl Magaña as Miguel
Roberto Ruy as Rosálio
Pedro Romo as Pedro
Pablo Ferrel as Pablo
Paco Ibáñez as Paco
Carlos Miguel as Ricardo
José Antonio Iturriaga as César
Adriana Lavat
Juan Carlos Casasola
Vilma Traca
Karla Ganem
Roberto Tello
Michelle Vieth

References

External links

1992 telenovelas
Mexican telenovelas
1992 Mexican television series debuts
1993 Mexican television series endings
Spanish-language telenovelas
Television shows set in Mexico City
Televisa telenovelas
Children's telenovelas